"" is a Portuguese Christmas song written in 1980 by César Batalha and Lúcia Carvalho for the Children's Choir of . It has become a classic Christmas pop song in Portugal.

See also
List of Christmas carols

References

Portuguese Christmas carols
Portuguese-language songs
1980 songs